Enemies were an Irish post-rock band from Wicklow, Ireland.

History
Enemies formed in the summer of 2007. They released their debut EP titled Alpha Waves in 2009 via Machu Picchu Industrias.

In 2010, Enemies released their first studio album titled We've Been Talking via The Richter Collective and Slick Stack.

In 2013, Enemies released their second studio album titled Embark, Embrace via Topshelf Records and Heavyweight Records.

In August 2015, Enemies released a song titled "Play Fire" from their upcoming third studio album.

On 28 September 2016, the band announced the release of their third album, Valuables. The album, released on 9 December of that year, and was their last. The band released a statement declaring the end of the band following their final album.

Band members
Former members
Lewis Jackson
Mark O’Brien
Eoin Whitfield
Oisin Trench
Micheál Quinn

Discography
Studio albums
We've Been Talking (2010, The Richter Collective, Stiff Slack)
Embark, Embrace (2013, Heavyweight, Topshelf)
Valuables (2016, Heavyweight, Topshelf)

EPs
Alpha Waves (2008, Popular Records, Machu Picchu Industrias)

References

Musical groups established in 2007
Irish post-rock groups
Irish rock music groups
2007 establishments in Ireland
Musical groups from County Wicklow
Topshelf Records artists